Khlea or khlii is a preserved meat, usually made with beef or lamb, originating from Morocco.
Khlea is made by cutting meat into strips and letting it dry in the sun after marinating it in garlic, coriander and cumin.
The meat is cooked in a mixture of water, oil and animal fat. Upon cooling, the meat is submerged in more animal fat and left to dry. Khlea can be preserved for up to two years at room temperature.

References 

Meat
Arab cuisine
Moroccan cuisine
African cuisine